Pithecops mariae is a small butterfly found in Sumatra that belongs to the lycaenids or blues family. It was first described by British Entomologist Lionel de Nicéville in 1894.

References

mariae
Butterflies described in 1894
Butterflies of Asia